Geisterfaust is the fifth album by the Jazz/Ambient band Bohren & der Club of Gore. The title translates to "ghostfist" and refers to a booze the band created.

Track listing 

 "Zeigefinger" - 20:29
 "Daumen" - 8:07
 "Ringfinger" - 10:23
 "Mittelfinger" - 12:10
 "Kleiner Finger" - 7:47

Personnel 
Thorsten Benning – drums and percussion
Christoph Clöser – Fender Rhodes keyboard, vibraharp, and saxophone
Morten Gass – 8-string bass, volume pedal
Robin Rodenberg – double bass and fretless bass

References 

2005 albums
Bohren & der Club of Gore albums